Antiochia in Lydia or Antiocheia in Lydia was a Hellenistic city founded by Antiochus IV in Lydia, Anatolia (currently, Turkey).  It is mentioned by the ancient geographer Stephanos Byzantinos as being located in Lydia, but its precise location is not currently known.

References

Seleucid colonies in Anatolia
Populated places in ancient Lydia
Former populated places in Turkey
Lost ancient cities and towns